Dave Molinari (born October 2, 1955, in Glassport, Pennsylvania) is an American sports journalist for the Pittsburgh Post-Gazette in Pittsburgh, Pennsylvania.

Early life
Molinari attended Elizabeth Forward High School and Penn State.

Career
He began his career with the McKeesport Daily News before being hired by The Pittsburgh Press in 1980, and the Post-Gazette in 1993.

In 2009, Molinari was awarded the Elmer Ferguson Memorial Award for his 27-year coverage of the Pittsburgh Penguins. The award is given by the Professional Hockey Writers' Association for newspaper professionals and coincides with induction into the Hockey Hall of Fame.

In June 2019, Molinari moved to DK Pittsburgh Sports, a subscription website dedicated to covering Pittsburgh sports teams, covering the Pittsburgh Penguins.

On May 2, 2022, it was announced that Molinari had moved to a new subscription website, Pittsburgh Hockey Now, continuing to cover the Pittsburgh Penguins.

Personal life
He is married and has three children.

References

Elmer Ferguson Award winners
American sportswriters
1955 births
Living people
Pittsburgh Post-Gazette people